Mahendra Thorve is an Indian politician serving as Member of the Maharashtra Legislative Assembly from Karjat Vidhan Sabha constituency as a member of Shiv Sena.

Positions held
 2019: Elected to Maharashtra Legislative Assembly

References

External links
  Shivsena Home Page 

Members of the Maharashtra Legislative Assembly
Year of birth missing (living people)
Living people
Shiv Sena politicians
Peasants and Workers Party of India politicians